Senggarang is a town in Batu Pahat District, Johor, Malaysia. Senggarang got its name from a crocodile that is said to reside in the Senggarang river, known as "Sang Garang". Until now, it is said that the crocodile is still alive in the Senggarang River.

There is a popular Chinese Temple in the town known as Qi Tian Da Sheng Fu Temple dedicated to the Monkey God, and also celebrate the Nine Emperor Gods Festival.

References

Neighbouring towns

Batu Pahat District
Towns in Johor